{{DISPLAYTITLE:C6H11NO}}
The molecular formula C6H11NO may refer to:

 Caprolactam (CPL)
 Cyclohexanone oxime
 N-Formylpiperidine
 Nylon 6 (repeating unit), or polycaprolactam

Molecular formulas